Lynchburg Presbyterian Church is a historic Presbyterian church located at South Lynchburg, Lee County, South Carolina.  It was built in 1855, and is a two-story temple-form Greek Revival style building with an engaged tetrastyle portico featuring four massive stuccoed solid brick columns. The interior is primarily a single room with plaster walls and 21 foot high ceiling, undecorated except for a large circular plaster medallion in the center.

It was added to the National Register of Historic Places in 2004.

References

Presbyterian churches in South Carolina
Churches on the National Register of Historic Places in South Carolina
Greek Revival church buildings in South Carolina
Churches completed in 1855
19th-century Presbyterian church buildings in the United States
Churches in Lee County, South Carolina
National Register of Historic Places in Lee County, South Carolina